Burnpur railway station is a railway station at Burnpur in Asansol, Paschim Bardhaman district, West Bengal. Its code is BURN. It serves Burnpur township, a neighborhood in Asansol. The station consists of three platforms. The platforms are  sheltered. There are sanitation services available, both payable and non-paying. An elevator is under construction as of August 2022.

Major trains
Some of the important trains that run from Burnpur are:

 Guwahati–Chennai Egmore Express
 Digha–Asansol Express 
 Puri Baidyanath Dham Express
 Tatanagar–Chhapra Express
 Tatanagar–Asansol Express
 Dibrugarh–Chennai Egmore Express
 Tatanagar–Danapur Express
 Haldia–Asansol Express
 South Bihar Express
 Barauni–Katihar Slip Express 
 Ernakulam–Patna Express (via Chennai)

References

Railway stations in Paschim Bardhaman district
Adra railway division